Ebenezer Porter (May 5, 1772 – April 8, 1834), D.D., was an American minister and writer.

Early life and career
The son of Vermont politician and judge Thomas Porter, Ebenezer was born in Cornwall, Connecticut on May 5, 1772.  He graduated from Dartmouth College in 1792, studied theology in Bethlehem, Connecticut, and in 1796 became pastor of the Congregational church in Washington, Connecticut.

In 1812 he was appointed professor of sacred rhetoric at Andover Theological Seminary, and he was appointed the academy's president in 1827, retaining both positions until his death.

In 1814 Dartmouth College awarded Porter an honorary Doctor of Divinity degree.

Author
Porter published Young Preacher's Manual; Analysis of Vocal Inflections; Analysis of the Principles of Rhetorical Delivery; Rhetorical Reader and Exercises; and Lectures on Homilectics and Preaching, and on Public Prayer, with Sermons and Addresses.  After his death, The Biblical Reader and Lectures on Eloquence and Style were also published.

Porter was also a contributor to the Quarterly Register, and a translator of many sacred German poems.

Death and burial
Porter died in Andover, Massachusetts on April 8, 1834.  He was buried in Phillips Academy Cemetery.

References

External links
This article incorporates text from the International Cyclopedia of 1890, a publication now in the public domain.
Lyman Matthews, Memoir on the Life and Character of Ebenezer Porter, D.D., 1837
Sarah Loring Bailey, Historical Sketches of Andover, 1880, page 571

1772 births
1834 deaths
American theologians
American sermon writers
Dartmouth College alumni
People from Cornwall, Connecticut
People from Andover, Massachusetts